João Moreira may refer to:
João Moreira (footballer, born 1970), Portuguese former footballer who played for Swansea City
João Moreira (footballer, born 1986), Portuguese footballer who last played in South Africa
João Moreira (footballer, born 1998), Portuguese footballer who plays for S.C. Freamunde
João Moreira (footballer, born 2004), Brazilian-born Portuguese footballer who plays for São Paulo
João Moreira (jockey) (born 1984), Brazilian jockey